Gaelle Broad is an Australian politician and former banker, who is a Nationals member of the Victorian Legislative Council representing the Northern Victoria Region, elected at the 2022 Victorian state election. She was previously a Nationals candidate for the district of Bendigo East in the 2018 Victorian state election, receiving 16% of the primary vote.

References

Living people
Members of the Victorian Legislative Council
National Party of Australia members of the Parliament of Victoria
21st-century Australian politicians
Women members of the Victorian Legislative Council
21st-century Australian women politicians
Year of birth missing (living people)